Meredith McGrath was the defending champion but did not compete that year.

Nathalie Tauziat won in the final 3–6, 6–0, 7–5 against Chanda Rubin.

Seeds
A champion seed is indicated in bold text while text in italics indicates the round in which that seed was eliminated. The top eight seeds received a bye to the second round.

  Kimiko Date (quarterfinals)
  Natasha Zvereva (semifinals)
  Brenda Schultz-McCarthy (third round)
  Helena Suková (third round)
  Gigi Fernández (third round)
  Lisa Raymond (third round)
  Marianne Werdel-Witmeyer (third round)
  Yayuk Basuki (quarterfinals)
  Zina Garrison-Jackson (third round)
  Lori McNeil (quarterfinals)
  Nathalie Tauziat (champion)
  Irina Spîrlea (first round)
  Chanda Rubin (final)
  Mana Endo (third round)
  Larisa Savchenko (second round)
  Miriam Oremans (second round)

Draw

Finals

Top half

Section 1

Section 2

Bottom half

Section 3

Section 4

External links
 1995 Direct Line International Championships draw

Eastbourne International
1995 WTA Tour